Ten national referendums were held in Switzerland in 2018. Polling took place on 4 March, 10 June, 23 September and 25 November.

March referendums
Two referendums were held on 4 March. One was on a Federal Decree on the new Financial Regulation 2021, which would extend the right of the federal government to levy VAT and direct federal tax until 2035; this was approved by 84% of voters. The other was the "Yes to the abolition of radio and television fees" popular initiative, which proposed abolishing the licence fee that provides the majority of funding for the Swiss Broadcasting Corporation. The proposal was rejected by the Federal Assembly in 2017, and by 72% of voters in the referendum.

Results

June referendums 

Two referendums were held on 10 June; one on the Sovereign Money Initiative proposal and one on the Federal Gambling Act.

The Sovereign Money Initiative proposal aims to give the Swiss National Bank a monopoly on money creation. It was launched by the Monetary Modernisation Association, without the support of any political party. The collection of signatures began on 3 June 2014, and the initiative was submitted to the Federal Chancellery on 1 December 2015 with over 110,000 valid signatures, despite its technical subject and without the support of political parties or other civil society organizations. The Federal Assembly recommended rejecting the initiative.

Results

September referendums
Three referendums were held on 23 September. The first was aimed at requiring the federal government to consider cycle paths in the same way as footpaths and hiking trails, the second would require the government to promote environmentally sound, animal-friendly and fairly produced foodstuffs, and the third to focus agriculture policy on small, family farms and to promote sustainable, diverse and gene-technology-free agriculture. The cycle paths initiative was approved, whilst the food and agriculture ones were rejected.

Results

November referendums 
Three referendums were held on 25 November. The first proposal aimed to subsidise farmers who did not dehorn their livestock. The second proposal would have explicitly given the Swiss Federal Constitution precedence over international law whenever the two contradict. The third initiative would allow insurance companies to hire their own detectives to spy on individuals suspected of abusing social welfare privileges.

Results

References

Switzerland
2018 in Switzerland
Referendums in Switzerland
March 2018 events in Switzerland
June 2018 events in Switzerland
September 2018 events in Switzerland
November 2018 events in Switzerland